Standards in Public Office is the title of an RTÉ programme broadcast on 7 December 2015. The programme featured three politicians, Hugh McElvaney (an independent former Mayor of Monaghan who had just left Fine Gael), Joe Queenan of Fianna Fáil and John O'Donnell (another independent), in compromising positions. It was presented by Conor Ryan.

Queenan immediately resigned from Fianna Fáil. McElvaney was asked to resign by his fellow public representatives, as was O'Donnell. All three were dismissed from their representative body, the Local Authority Members Association (LAMA), though John O'Donnell initially refused to leave and then had his membership revoked.

The programme was mentioned in both Houses of the Oireachtas. Taoiseach Enda Kenny referred to the programme in the Dáil. Senator David Norris, while expressing distaste for the actions of those involved, also criticised RTÉ's approach to their investigation as entrapment. McElvaney's gestures, movements and utterances of "sterling", "money" and "loads of money" during the programme were instantly remixed with Los del Río's 1990s song "Macarena".

References

External links
 Standards in Public Office
 Clip - McElvaney
 Clip - Queenan
 MICHAEL CLIFFORD: Does anybody really believe ethics in public office will be an election issue?

2015 in Irish politics
2015 in Irish television
2015 in the Republic of Ireland
History of Fianna Fáil
History of Fine Gael
RTÉ controversies
RTÉ original programming